Government Institute of Rehabilitation Medicine is a state-owned hospital situated in K. K. Nagar in Chennai, India. Founded in 1979, the hospital is funded and managed by the state government of Tamil Nadu and is attached to Directorate of Medical Education. It is the only government-run centre that makes prosthetic limbs.

History
Tamil Nadu was the first state in the country to start a three-year diploma course in orthotics and prosthetics in the late 1960s. The course was conducted by the orthopaedics department of Madras Medical College to which the Government General Hospital is attached. In 1979, the Government Institute of Rehabilitation Medicine was opened, where students were trained to develop prosthesis. In 1968, the institute developed the Madras Foot, which was designed to incorporate metti (traditional toe rings) meant for married women. The design was later used by a physician named Sethi for the Jaipur foot.

The hospital today
The hospital has been in limbo for many years now. As of 2013, the institute has only 12 workers. Although earlier there were 72 technicians, the vacancies created due to retirement were not filled for a long time, resulting in 64 posts being vacant.

See also

 Healthcare in Chennai
 Government General Hospital

References

Hospital buildings completed in 1979
Government buildings completed in 1979
1979 establishments in Tamil Nadu
Hospitals in Chennai
Hospitals established in 1979
20th-century architecture in India